Kolavayal is a place in Ajanur village in Kanhangad town, Kasaragod district, Kerala, India. It is a coastal place.

Constituent villages
The area consist of villages Ittammal, Main Kolavayal, Thayal Kolavayal, Vivekananda Nagar, Muttumthala, Palayi & Kothikkal. There are many mosques and temples in these areas.

Education
The schools in this area are Iqbal Higher Secondary School, Crescent English Medium School and Vivekananda Vidyalayam.

Postal Service
The Kolavayal Post Office is located at Main Kolavayal which is the post office for Kolavayal and nearby areas.

Economy
Many of the people have migrated to Gulf for their livelihood.

Transportation
Local roads have access to NH.66 which connects to Mangalore in the north and Calicut in the south. The nearest railway station is Kanhangad on Mangalore-Palakkad line. The nearby airports are Mangalore Airport, Kannur Airport  and Calicut Airport.

References

Kanhangad area